Ali Bouziane (born 25 March 1977 in Boufarik, Blida Province) is a former Algerian professional basketball player. He also played for the Algeria national basketball team.

Professional basketball player

Paris Basket Racing 
August 2005 – February 2006 7 months

After the nice season with Paris Basket Racing, he was recruited by the Polish Euroleague team of Sopot Trefl. Bouzaine's 1st experience abroad. It took him out of his comfort zone.

Levallois Metropolitans 
August 2004 – June 2005 11 months

Paris Area, France

After 5 years and a lot of emotions in the north of France, he signed with Paris Basket Racing.

Performance and titles:

Best defence of the league

BCM Gravelines Dunkerque 
August 1999 – June 2004 4 years, 11 months

Gravelines

After "Toulouse Spacer's" Bank out in 1999, Bouziane signed for BCM Gravelines Dunkerque in proA (1st division).

Performance and titles:

Best Africa starting five (guard)

French National team A'

Toulouse spacer's 
August 1995 – June 1999 3 years, 11 months

Toulouse Area, France

After 2 seasons at "pôle France Yvan Mainini" in Paris from 16 to 18 years old, he started his professional career at 18 years old in ProB (2nd French division) in Toulouse.

Performance and titles:

1995 selected for the U21 French All star game (Dijon)

Coach 

 Elan Chalon

June 2019 – present 
 AS Monaco Basket-Ball S.A. (ROCA TEAM)

August 2014 – October 2018 4 years, 3 months

Monaco area

After a 5-year break from basketball, Monaco was his first experience as a coach. He started from the bottom. He coached the U15 in Menton Basket Club and the U17 in A.S. Monaco Basketball the 1st season.

 2017/2018	A.S Monaco	
 2016/2017	A.S MONACO
 2015/2016	A.S. Monaco	
 2014/2015	A.S Monaco

References

External links
 Profile FIBA Europe

1977 births
Living people
AEL Limassol B.C. players
Algerian men's basketball players
Algerian expatriate basketball people in France
Algerian expatriate basketball people in Poland
BCM Gravelines players
JDA Dijon Basket players
Paris Racing Basket players
People from Boufarik
Asseco Gdynia players
Point guards
21st-century Algerian people